Thandie Galleta (born 27 January 1993) is a Malawian netball player who plays for Malawi in the positions of WA or C.

Career 
She has featured in two World Cup tournaments for Malawi in 2015 and in 2019. She made her Commonwealth Games debut representing Malawi at the 2018 Commonwealth Games.

She was named in Malawian netball squad for the women's netball tournament at the 2022 Commonwealth Games.

References 

1994 births
Living people
Malawian netball players
Netball players at the 2018 Commonwealth Games
Netball players at the 2022 Commonwealth Games
Commonwealth Games competitors for Malawi
2019 Netball World Cup players